Slovenian car number plates are vehicle registration plates found on Slovenian cars. The code for Slovenia itself is SLO. The registration plates are made of metal. On the left there is a blue bar as in other EU countries (in use since 2004) along with tamper-proof text up to 2008; the text is in black letters on a white background in Helvetica typeface. In 2008 the plates reverted to a green border used before 2004 and the old font but retaining the EU border at the left. Two plates must be present on each car - one at the front and one at the rear. In the case of motorcycles, only one plate is needed on the back of the vehicle. These plates can have different sizes, being the regional code in the first line, at the top.

Location prefixes and regional divisions
On regular issue license plates, the first 2 letters before the shield sticker denote the region where the car was initially registered. Further division is made by the coat of arms of the corresponding city, placed after the regional area letters to denote subdivisions.

Special plates

Diplomatic plates on official diplomatic cars are prefixed CMD and CD. Other cars of international and diplomatic missions start are prefixed M. All have four digits after the letters. The first two numbers identify the organization or embassy. Since early 2001 all have the letter in green and then numbers in black on a white background.
Military plates consist of white letters on a black background or opposite and start with "SV".
Police plates are blue on a white background and start with "P".
Temporary plates for long periods are black on white with a euroband (since 2004), the region code and crest followed by one letter, one numeral, a hyphen, one numeral and one letter. The last two digits of the year are vertically aligned on the right. Motorcycle plates have the euroband, code and crest above three numerals and the two digits for the year.
Temporary test plates previously contained "E" in the serial and had a green background. Current temporary plate are white with a red band with the region code, letters "PR" vertically on a red band, one letter, two numerals, a hyphen and three numerals. Metal plates for dealers have the region code and crest followed by one letter and two numerals.
Export plates are black on a yellow background with the month and year of validity in little black panels to the right.
Moped plates are same as export plates, except in a reduced size.
Agricultural plates are white on a green background. 
Trailer plates had the reverse format of the regular issue plates i.e. the region code is after the shield and the serial number before.

References

External links

Olav's Slovenian license plates
Gallery of regional division shields

Slovenia
Road transport in Slovenia
Slovenia transport-related lists
 Registration plates